Tendler is a predominantly Yiddish derived Ashkenazi Jewish surname originating in-part to Bessarabia (now Moldova)  in the region previously known as the Pale of Settlement. Notable individuals with the surname include:

Adam Tendler, American classical pianist
Annamarie Tendler, American multimedia artist known for her work in photography and textiles 
Keren Tendler (died 2006), Israeli first female helicopter flight mechanic
Lew Tendler (1898–1970), American boxer
Michael Tendler (born 1947), Russian-Swedish physicist
Moshe David Tendler, rabbi and biology professor, expert in Jewish medical ethics
Saul Tendler, British pharmacy academic
Sidnei Tendler (born 1958), Brazilian-Belgian architect, designer, painter and poet
Silvio Tendler, director of the Brazilian documentary, Jango
Susan Tendler, American rabbi

German-language surnames
Jewish surnames